= William Song =

American electrical engineer

William Song is an engineer at the MIT Lincoln Laboratory in Lexington, Massachusetts. He was named a Fellow of the Institute of Electrical and Electronics Engineers (IEEE) in 2015 for his contributions to high-performance low-power embedded processors.
